Jalu, Jallow, or Gialo is a town in the Al Wahat District in northeastern Libya in the Jalo oasis. An oasis, a city, and it is the main center of the oasis region in eastern Libya.  It is located at the confluence of longitude and latitude (21-29), and the most important characteristic of visitors and onlookers is the presence of dense palm forests linking the sand dunes and plateaus of the Libyan desert.  Its inhabitants were famous for trade and transporting goods from Cyrenaica and Tripoli to (Chad, Egypt and Sudan) and other African countries. It is an ancient oasis mentioned by Arab travelers, and orientalists in many historical sources. Historical sources mention that the people of the Jallow oasis were the first to conduct trade caravans along the longest desert route from  The Libyan coast to central and eastern Africa around the middle of the nineteenth century and the beginning of the twentieth century.

Notable people
 Abu-Bakr Yunis Jabr (1952-2011) - Libyan Minister of Defence (1970-2011)

See also 
 List of cities in Libya

Notes

Populated places in Al Wahat District
Cyrenaica
Protected areas of Libya
Baladiyat of Libya